Pecatonica may refer to:

 Pecatonica, Illinois
 Pecatonica River of Illinois and Wisconsin